Awesome as Fuck (marketed as Awesome as F**k, Awesome as ****, or Awesome: Live) is a live album by American rock band Green Day, released on March 22, 2011, by Reprise Records. The album is composed of tracks recorded during Green Day's 2009–10 21st Century Breakdown World Tour in support of their eighth studio album 21st Century Breakdown (2009). It includes a DVD of a concert recorded at the Saitama Super Arena in Saitama, Japan. It is also available in Blu-ray.

Reception

At Metacritic, which assigns a normalized rating out of 100 to reviews from mainstream publications, the album received an average score of 64, which indicates "generally favorable reviews". Stephen Thomas Erlewine of Allmusic remarked that Awesome as Fuck "satisfies without surprising [...] The set list is a good mix that leans heavily on Green Day's new millennium standards and the bandmembers never sound tired playing: they hit their marks with enthusiasm, which is enough to make Awesome as F**k fun, if not quite a live album for the ages." David Fricke of Rolling Stone commented "This set is a contagious account of the power-fun streak that still runs through the band even after the two punk operas [...] Billie Joe Armstrong thoroughly enjoys his spotlight: shouting, cursing and letting audiences take whole verses of 'American Idiot' and 'Good Riddance.' And drummer Tré Cool is way up in the mix, channeling the Clash's Topper Headon and the Who's Keith Moon with precise demonic glee."

Chris Conaton of PopMatters said that the album "has a bit of the odor of a record-company stopgap about it", noting the five-year gap between the band's last two studio albums, American Idiot (2004) and 21st Century Breakdown (2009), that was filled by the live album and DVD Bullet in a Bible (2005). He noted that the band was "at least trying to do something different" with this second live album: Bullet in a Bible's album and video documented a single two-night stand in England, while Awesome as Fuck's album draws from sixteen different concerts around the world and the video is taken from a single show. He also remarked that the album's track list contains "treats for longtime fans" in the form of "some of the band's lesser singles and even some deep album tracks"—including the previously unreleased "Cigarettes and Valentines" and the older tracks "Burnout", "Going to Pasalacqua", "J.A.R.", and "Who Wrote Holden Caulfield?"—saying "It's this quintet of songs that really sets Awesome as F**k apart and gives it a kick as a live set." He criticized the fact that hearing the songs played live was not that different from hearing the studio recordings, calling them "generally the same beyond Armstrong telling the crowd to sing this part or that" and remarking that Green Day's arena show is "a wonderful experience in person, but it understandably loses something in the translation to CD and DVD."

Track listing

Album

Video

80 Mins Approx.

Personnel

Band
Billie Joe Armstrong – lead vocals, rhythm and lead guitars
Mike Dirnt – bass guitar, backing vocals, co-lead vocals on Jesus of Suburbia and American Eulogy
Tré Cool – drums, backing vocals

Additional musicians
Jason White – lead and rhythm guitars, backing vocals
Jason Freese – keyboards, horns, backing vocals
Jeff Matika – rhythm guitar, backing vocals

Production

Album
Chris Dugan – mix engineer
Ted Jensen – mastering
Kevin Lemoine – recording engineer
Brad Kobylckzak – recording engineer
Mike Manning – assistant engineer
Kumar Butler – assistant engineer
Sergio Almonte – assistant engineer
Nick Tresko – assistant engineer
Ben Hirschfield – assistant engineer

Video
Chris Dugan – director
Bill Berg-Hillinger – director, editor, colorist
Ryan Cooke – additional editor
Michael Mastrangelo – additional editor
Carl Jordan – additional editor
Tammy Berg – additional editor
Bill Butterfield – additional editor
Chris Johnston – post-audio mixing
David May – post producer
Justin Lomax – editor of "Cigarettes and Valentines"
Shane Ruggieri – colorist of "Cigarettes and Valentines"

Artwork
Chris Bilheimer – art direction
Chris Dugan – photography

Charts

Certifications and sales

References

Green Day albums
2011 live albums
2011 video albums
Concert films
Reprise Records live albums
Reprise Records video albums
Live video albums
Albums recorded at Saitama Super Arena